This is a list of foreign ministers of Solomon Islands.

 1978–1981: Peter Kenilorea
 1981–1982: Ezekiel Alebua
 1982............ Michael Evo 
 1982–1984: Dennis Carlos Lulei
 1984–1985: George Talasasa
 1985–1988: Paul Tovua
 1988–1989: Sir Peter Kenilorea
 1989–1990: Sir Baddeley Devesi
 1990–1993: Sir Peter Kenilorea
 1993–1994: Job Tausinga
 1994–1995: Francis Saemala
 1995–1996: Danny Philip
 1996–1997: David Sitai
 1997–2000: Patteson Oti
 2000–2001: Danny Philip
 2001............ David Sitai
 2001–2002: Alex Bartlett
 2002............ Nollen Leni
 2002–2006: Laurie Chan
 2006–2007: Patteson Oti
 2007–2010: William Haomae
 2010–2012: Peter Shanel Agovaka
 2012–2014: Clay Forau Soalaoi
 2014–2019: Milner Tozaka
 2019–present: Jeremiah Manele

Sources
 Rulers.org – Foreign ministers S–Z

Foreign
Foreign Ministers
Politicians